The Tidore are a major ethnic group living in North Maluku province of Indonesia. They primarily live in Tidore island and also in some parts of Halmahera. They speak the Tidore language. The Tidore people are predominantly Muslims and famous as the founders of the Tidore Sultanate, the easternmost Islamic kingdom in the world along with Ternate, Jailolo and Bacan.

References 

Ethnic groups in North Maluku